The Agrarian Union (ZC) was a political party in Poland.

History
The party was established on 11 May 1924 by a merger of the Polish People's Party "Left" and a breakaway faction of the Polish People's Party "Piast". In January 1926 it merged into Stronnictwo Chłopskie.

The party was reformed in 1928 by Jan Stapiński. In the elections that year, the party received 1.2% of the vote, winning three seats in the Sejm. In 1931 it became a faction within the Nonpartisan Bloc for Cooperation with the Government and ceased to exist as an independent party.

References

1924 establishments in Poland
1926 disestablishments in Poland
1928 establishments in Poland
1931 disestablishments in Poland
Agrarian parties in Poland
Defunct political parties in Poland
Polish People's Party
Political parties disestablished in 1926
Political parties disestablished in 1931
Political parties established in 1924
Political parties established in 1928